Daniella Maria Deutscher (born October 4, 1975), also sometimes credited as Daniella Wolters, is an American actress, best known for playing Julie Connor on the American Saturday morning television series Hang Time (1995–2000).

Biography 
Deutscher grew up in Olympia, Washington and was a star basketball player for Olympia High School, starting on varsity for all four years. She began her acting career portraying Julie Connor on the Saturday morning TNBC television series Hang Time, in which her character was the only girl on a boys' basketball team.  Deutscher and her castmate Megan Parlen were the only two actors who appeared in every episode of the series.

Deutscher played the role of Wendy in the movie Special Forces, her character being that of an American journalist held captive by a Muldonian warlord. Deutscher has also appeared on television in the daytime drama The Bold and the Beautiful. 

She is married to her former Hang Time co-star Jay Hernandez.

Filmography 
 Hang Time (1995–2000) (TV series)
 Special Forces (2003) (Movie)
 Las Vegas (2005) (TV series)
 Aquaman (2006) (TV series pilot)

References

External links 
 

1975 births
Living people
People from Bozeman, Montana
University of Southern California alumni
American television actresses
21st-century American women